Kate Woods (born 11 October 1981) is a South African field hockey player.

Woods was born Kate Hector on 11 October 1981 in Johannesburg, Gauteng.  She attended Durban Girls' College. She was a member of the national squad that finished 9th at the 2004 Summer Olympics in Athens. The midfielder's hometown is Cape Town, and she is nicknamed KT. She plays for a provincial team based in Western Province.

At the 2012 Summer Olympics she competed with the South Africa women's national field hockey team in the women's tournament.

She is married to water polo player Duncan Woods. Her brother is first-class cricketer Benjamin Hector.

International Senior Tournaments
 2003 – All Africa Games (Abuja, Nigeria)
 2004 – Olympic Games (Athens, Greece)
 2005 – Champions Challenge (Virginia Beach, United States)
 2006 – Commonwealth Games (Melbourne, Australia)
 2006 – World Cup (Madrid, Spain)
 2008 – Olympic Games (Beijing, PR China)
 2012 – Olympic Games (London, United Kingdom)

References

External links

Living people
1981 births
South African female field hockey players
South African people of British descent
Olympic field hockey players of South Africa
Place of birth missing (living people)
Field hockey players at the 2004 Summer Olympics
Field hockey players at the 2006 Commonwealth Games
Field hockey players at the 2008 Summer Olympics
Field hockey players at the 2012 Summer Olympics
Field hockey players from Johannesburg
Commonwealth Games competitors for South Africa
Field hockey players from Cape Town
African Games gold medalists for South Africa
Competitors at the 2003 All-Africa Games
African Games medalists in field hockey
21st-century South African women